William Stiles Rademacher (May 13, 1942 – April 2, 2018) was an American professional football player who played as a wide receiver for seven seasons for the New York Jets and Boston Patriots.  He earned MVP honors in 1963  In January 1969 he played in Super Bowl III.

During Rademacher's tenure as assistant coach at Northern Michigan University, the football team went from a 0–10 season in 1974 to a 13–1 season in 1975 and won the NCAA Division II Football Championship.

Rademacher became Northern Michigan's head coach in 1978, earning a record of 37–16–1 in five seasons and three NCAA Division II tournament appearances. He was named Association of Mid-Continent Universities Coach of the Year in 1980, and Northern Michigan went 10–0 in the 1981 regular season. He left to coach the linebackers at Michigan State from 1983 to 1991.

Rademacher was inducted into the Northern Michigan University Hall of Fame in the 1981 and the Upper Peninsula Sports Hall of Fame  in 1983.

Head coaching record

References

External links
 
 

1942 births
2018 deaths
American football wide receivers
American Football League players
Boston Patriots players
Michigan State Spartans football coaches
New York Jets players
Northern Michigan Wildcats football coaches
Northern Michigan Wildcats football players
Xavier Musketeers football coaches
People from Menominee, Michigan
Players of American football from Michigan